Dobrá is a municipality and village in Frýdek-Místek District in the Moravian-Silesian Region of the Czech Republic. It has about 3,200 inhabitants.

Geography
Dobrá is located in the historical region of Cieszyn Silesia. It lies in the Moravian-Silesian Foothills on the right bank of the Morávka River.

History
The settlement was first mentioned in a Latin document of Diocese of Wrocław called Liber fundationis episcopatus Vratislaviensis from around 1305 as Dobroczemicza. The creation of the village was a part of a larger settlement campaign taking place in the late 13th century on the territory of what will be later known as Upper Silesia.

Politically the village belonged initially to the Duchy of Teschen, formed in 1290 in the process of feudal fragmentation of Poland and was ruled by a local branch of Piast dynasty. In 1327 the duchy became a fee of Kingdom of Bohemia, which after 1526 became part of the Habsburg monarchy.

The village became a seat of a Catholic parish, mentioned in the register of Peter's Pence payment from 1447 among 50 parishes of Teschen deaconry as Dobersey.

In 1573 it was sold as one of 16 villages and the town of Friedeck and formed a state country split from the Duchy of Teschen.

After World War I and fall of Austria-Hungary it became a part of Czechoslovakia. In March 1939 it became a part of Protectorate of Bohemia and Moravia. After World War II it was restored to Czechoslovakia.

Sights

The current late Baroque building of the Church of Saint George dates from 1682–1686. The so-called Russian tower was added in 1816.

The Baroque building of the "U Oráče" restaurant dates from the turn of the 17th and 18th centuries, behind which a Baroque granary from the 18th century has been preserved.

Notable people
David Stypka (1979–2021), singer

Twin towns – sister cities

Dobrá is twinned with:
 Buczkowice, Poland
 Mucharz, Poland
 Ochodnica, Slovakia

References

External links

 

Villages in Frýdek-Místek District
Cieszyn Silesia